Geoffrey Martel primarily refers to Geoffrey II, Count of Anjou (1040–60), but may also refer to:
Geoffrey IV, Count of Anjou (1103–06)
Geoffrey V, Count of Anjou (1129–51)
Geoffrey, Count of Nantes (1156–58)